Aris Marangopoulos (translit. Maragkopoulos; b. Athens, 1948) is a Greek author, literary critic and translator. He studied History and Archeology at the University of Athens, History of Art and Archeology at the University of Paris 1 Pantheon-Sorbonne.

Marangopoulos is a politically committed intellectual (but with no political adherence to any particular party) who has been writing since the early eighties.  Some of his older fiction cult books deal with the Utopian idea of communal love as a means of civil disobedience but those more recent and more widely read deal with a contemporary social context, pictured through known historic facts of political disobedience against state impingement of civil rights. In seeming contrast to that realist predilection his literary style, though, should not be defined as purely realistic. A writer who, in some of his older books, has adopted the modernist form of a poème en prose A.M. rather stands for an elective modernist style. Vassilis Vassilikos, author of the novel Z, has written for Marangopoulos' politically engaged novel Obsession with Spring: «It is the outcome of a difficult journey through the clashing rocks of James Joyce and Jorge Luis Borges, a fruitful journey that made him rediscover Honoré de Balzac’s gold… A fantastic political thriller, an anatomy of the country we call Hellas, a novel that opens a wide discussion amid the reading community since it re-reads our recent history» 

His more widely read novel so far (and one of his best as most critics agree), The Slap-tree, is a story that reviews post-war Greece through the eyes of a foreign woman, a Welsh teacher who during WW II fell in love with a young Greek communist and thereafter put every possible effort to free him from an incarceration of 17 years (a true story which made to the first page of international media in the sixties). Apart from its literary merits the story has ignited a certain discussion and dispute in Greece as to the possible ways of narrating historic facts in literature. 

His «French» novel Paul et Laura, tableau d’après nature (Topos books 2017) is inspired by the lives of the intellectual activist Paul Lafargue (1842-1911, best known for his polemic essay The Right To Be Lazy) and his wife Laura Marx (1845-1911). The mythical life of these two characters who at their old age (Paul 69, Laura 66) decided to die together by a suicide pact is painted in this novel as a concave mirror reflecting the tumultuous development of the European society in the second half of 19th and the beginnings of the 20th century.
The novel is considered by all critics to be the opus magnum of the author: See e.g. A. Sainis's review (in Efimerida Syntakton 19.02.17), Efi Giannopoulou's (in Epochi, 24.01.17), Maria Moira's (in Aygi of Sunday, 19.03.17) [See more reviews in Greek and English here]. This last critic has noted on account of this book:  «This daring narrative by Aris Maragkopoulos dips decisively into a staggering factual material comprising important historical characters and shocking social contents, multi specific primary sources, indexed information and multiple cross linked time records. The author, for the sake of the plot fills with sensitivity, respect and creative verve the space between the prominent historical moments that marked the course of our world, giving the historical figures of the central ideological scene a human face and in their daily lives a parallel dimension of plausibility. He removes the strangeness created by the distance in time and the inevitable mythology, and creates a dense grid of inventive interventions and interstitial links.» 
Marangopoulos is considered an authority on James Joyce in Greece. He has published indeed three books and many articles on the matter. His most important study, Ulysses, A reader's guide is principally an attempt to explain James Joyce's Ulysses through affinities to its Homeric counterpart, the Odyssey, – affinities clearly exposed for the reader, in richly documented text. Exegetic suggestions in response to central issues of the Joycean critical literature are also seriously treated in the volume – documented as they are in a thorough textual and intertextual analysis of the original. His Joycean studies have influenced his critical reading of Greek modern and contemporary prose: his writings over the years ask for a total re-mapping of the reception of literature in Greece. 

He has served for two consecutive terms as Secretary Executive of the Hellenic Authors' Society.
His novel Love, Gardens, Ingratitude has been translated into Serbian and has been shortlisted for the National Literary Award of 2002, his Obsession with Spring into Turkish, his short novel Nostalgic Clone into English and various texts and articles into English, French, Turkish and Serbian. His novel Paul et Laura, tableau d'après nature has been shortlisted for the National Literary Award of 2018. He has received the special prize for literature of the literary magazine Anagnostis ("Nikos Themelis award") for his novel Fllsst, fllsst, flllssst (June 2021).

Works

Novels
 Φλλσστ, φλλσστ, φλλλσσστ (Fllsst, fllsst, flllssst), Topos books, 2020
 Πολ και Λόρα, ζωγραφική εκ του φυσικού (Paul et Laura, tableau d'après nature), Topos books, 2016
 Το Χαστουκόδεντρο (The Slap-tree), Topos books, 2012
 H μανία με την Άνοιξη (Obsession with Spring), Ellinika Grammata, 2006, Topos books 2009
 Αγάπη, Κήποι, Αχαριστία (Love, Gardens, Ingratitude), Kedros publishers 2002
 Οι ωραίες ημέρες του Βενιαμίν Σανιδόπουλου (Fine days of Benjamin Sanidopoulos), Kedros publishers 1998
 Oldsmobile, Eleutheros Typos, A: 1982 B (The 80's trilogy collective ed.): 2018

Novellae
 True Love, Topos books, 2008
 Τα δεδομένα της ζωής μας (The Facts of our Lives), A' Ellinika Grammata, 2002, B' Topos books, 2015

Short stories
 Γλυκειά Επιστροφή (Sweet Come back), Ellinika Grammata, 2003
 Δεν είναι όλα σινεμά μωρό μου (This is no cinema, baby), Eleftheros Typos, A: 1985 B (The 80's trilogy collective ed.): 2018
 Ψυχομπουρδέλο (Psycho-brothel), Eleftheros Typos, A: 1983 B (The 80's trilogy collective ed.): 2018

Selected essays
 Πορτρέτο του συγγραφέα ως κριτικού, Ανθολογία κριτικών κειμένων & Εργογραφία, επιμ.: Άννα Κατσιγιάννη - Κατερίνα Κωστίου (Portrait of the Writer as a literary Critic, an anthology of critical texts & Ergography), Topos books 2022
 Ο κ. Ιάκωβος Ζώης και ο κ. Τζάκομο Τζόις (An introduction to Giacomo Joyce as an introduction to James Joyce's œuvre), Topos books 2018 
 Πεδία Μάχης Αφύλακτα (Unguarded Battlefields, a thesis on contemporary Greek culture), Topos books 2014
 Ulysses, Οδηγός Ανάγνωσης (Ulysses, a Reader's Guide), Delfini 1996, Kedros publishers 2001, Topos books 2010 / 2022
 Διαφθορείς, Εραστές, Παραβάτες (Seducers, Lovers, Transgressors), Ellinika Grammata, 2005

Illustrated books
 Αυτόπτης φωτομάρτυρας στην οδό των ονείρων (Greek pop music of the 60's, photos from Takis Pananides archive), Topos books 2013
 Η άλλη Ελλάδα: 1950-1965 (An Unknown Greece: 1950-1965, a short history of modern Greece, photos from K. Megalokonomou archive), Topos books A: 2007, B: 2018
 Ρωσία: 100 χρόνια (A short history of Russia based on photos from various archives), Stavros Niarchos institution, Rizareion institution, 2002
 Αγαπημένο Βρωμοδουβλίνο: Τόποι και Γλώσσες στον Οδυσσέα του Τζέιμς Τζόις(Dear Dirty Dublin: The Scene and the Language in Joyce's Ulysses), Kedros publishers, 1997, (revised edition with extended iconography and comments) Topos books, 2022.

Selected translations
Note: dates given are of the first publication of the Greek translation
Swift, Jonathan, Τα ταξίδια του Γκάλιβερ (Gulliver's Travels), 1996
Defoe, Daniel, Ροβινσώνας Κρούσος (Robinson Crusoe),  1997
Joyce, James, Τζάκομο Τζόις (Giacomo Joyce),  A: 1994, B: 2018
James, Henry, Πλατεία Ουάσιγκτον  (Washington Square), 1997
Balzac, Honoré de, Σαραζίνος (Sarrasine), 1999
Duras, Marguerite, Moderato Cantabile (Moderato Cantabile), A: 1991, B: 2017

References

External links
 Personal website as a work in progress (in English), Personal website as a work in progress (in Greek)
 Author's biography at the website of the Greek "Authors' Society" (in English)
Author's biography at the website of Topos Books

Writers from Athens
20th-century Greek writers
21st-century Greek writers
1948 births
Living people
University of Paris alumni
Modernism